This list of universities in Ankara lists the universities within the city limits of Ankara.

Public universities

Private universities

Former universities

See also 

 List of universities in Istanbul
 List of universities in İzmir
 List of universities in Turkey
 Education in Turkey

References 

Universities
 
Universities in Ankara